Panama competed at the 1968 Summer Olympics in Mexico City, Mexico.

Results by event

Basketball

Men's Team Competition
Preliminary Round (Group A)
Lost to Yugoslavia (85-96)
Lost to Italy (87-94)
Lost to Spain (82-88)
Defeated Philippines (95-92)
Lost to United States (60-95)
Lost to Puerto Rico (69-80)
Defeated Senegal (94-79)
Classification Matches
9th/12th place: Lost to Bulgaria (79-83)
11th/12th place: Lost to Cuba (88-91)
Team Roster
Calixto Malcom
Davis Peralta
Eliécer Ellis
Ernesto Agard
Francisco Checa
Julio Osorio
Luis Sinclair
Nicolas Alvarado
Norris Webb
Pedro Rivas
Percibal Blades
Ramón Reyes

Weightlifting
Men's Bantamweight
Guillermo Boyd

Men's Featherweight
Ildefonso Lee

Wrestling
Men's Freestyle Flyweight
Wanelge Castillo

Men's Freestyle Lightweight 
Severino Aguilar

References
sports-reference
Official Olympic Reports

Nations at the 1968 Summer Olympics
1968
1968 in Panamanian sport